Therese Gardella (December 19, 1894 – January 3, 1950) was an American performer on the stage and screen whose stage persona was Aunt Jemima. She was of Italian descent. The Aunt Jemima brand name used for pancake mix and related products in the United States was patterned after her performance persona. She performed on both stage and screen, usually in blackface. Tess was born in Glen Lyon, Pennsylvania, to John and Louisa Gardella. She came to New York City in 1918, singing in dances and nightclubs and also political rallies.

She died of diabetes in Brooklyn, New York, on January 3, 1950.<ref name="obit">obituary, VarietyJan. 11,1950</ref>

Vaudeville
She was introduced to the vaudeville stage by Lew Leslie, who gave her the stage name of Aunt Jemima. She appeared at the Palace and the New York Hippodrome, and attracted very favorable reviews from Variety.

For her final performance, she returned to vaudeville, playing the Palace once more in 1949.

Theater
Her first performance in the legitimate theater was in the 1921 version of George White's Scandals.But she was best known for her role in the classic stage musical Show Boat in 1927, where she originated the role of Queenie. She was the only member of the original Broadway cast to appear in blackface; the show featured an African-American chorus. Jules Bledsoe, who originated the role of Joe in the same production and sang Ol' Man River, was also African-American. She played the entire original run of the show, which ended in May 1929, and even returned for a 1932 Broadway revival which reunited most of the original 1927 cast.  After Show Boat, she returned to the vaudeville stage.

Film

During the 1930s, Gardella appeared in occasional movie shorts filmed in New York, including the Vitaphone series Rambling 'Round Radio Row (1932–34). She appeared in the film that made Shirley Temple a star, Stand Up and Cheer! (1934). She was usually billed as "Aunt Jemima".

In 1938, the Vitaphone studio starred her as "Tess Gardella (Aunt Jemima)" in the two-reel musical short A Swing Opera. In this updated condensation of the famous operetta The Bohemian Girl, with special lyrics by Sammy Cahn and Saul Chaplin, Gardella was top-billed as the gypsy queen and does not wear blackface.Billboard'' summed up her appeal as the personification of the "colored mammy."

References

External links
 
 
 

1894 births
1950 deaths
American stage actresses
American film actresses
American people of Italian descent
Blackface minstrel performers
Burials at Calvary Cemetery (Queens)
Deaths from diabetes
Vaudeville performers
20th-century American actresses
20th-century American women singers
20th-century American singers